The Rwanda Rugby Federation is the governing body for rugby union in Rwanda. It is a member of the Confederation of African Rugby (CAR), now known as Rugby Africa and it has been a full member of World Rugby since December 2015.

References

Rugby union governing bodies in Africa
Rugby union in Rwanda